Laurel is part of the English common name of many trees and other plants, particularly those of the laurel family (Lauraceae). Most laurels are highly poisonous.

Plants called "laurel" include:

 Alexandrian laurel:
 Calophyllum inophyllum, an evergreen tree in family Calophyllaceae
 Danae racemosa, a small shrub in family Asparagaceae
 Azores laurel, Laurus azorica 
 Bog laurel:
 Kalmia microphylla
 Kalmia polifolia
 California laurel, Umbellularia californica
 Camphor laurel, Cinnamomum camphora
 Canary laurel, Laurus novocanariensis 
 Cape laurel, Ocotea bullata
 Cherry laurel, Prunus laurocerasus
 Chilean laurel, Laurelia sempervirens
 Chinese laurel, Antidesma bunius
 Copper laurel, Eupomatia laurina, a flowering-plant family Eupomatiaceae
 Ecuador laurel, Cordia alliodora
 English Laurel, Prunus laurocerasus
 Grecian or bay laurel, Laurus nobilis
 Great laurel, Rhododendron maximum
 Hedge laurel, Pittosporum erioloma
 Indian laurel (disambiguation)
 Japanese laurel, Aucuba japonica
 Laurel clock vine, Thunbergia laurifolia
 Laurel sumac, Malosma laurina
 Mountain laurel (disambiguation), several plants
 New Zealand laurel:
 Corynocarpus laevigatus
 Coprosma repens
 Pig laurel, Kalmia angustifolia
 Portugal laurel, Prunus lusitanica
 Sheep laurel, Kalmia angustifolia
 Spineless butcher's-broom, Ruscus hypoglossum
 Spotted laurel, Aucuba japonica
 Spurge laurel, Daphne laureola
 Swamp laurel:
 Kalmia microphylla
 Kalmia polifolia

Notes

See also
Laurel wreath

Set index articles on plant common names